The Tawa River is a tributary of the Narmada River of Central India.

Course
The Tawa is the Narmada's largest tributary, at 172 km.  It rises in the Satpura Range of Betul and  flowing north and west, joins the Narmada at the village of Bandra Bhan in Hoshangabad District.

Dam
In 1958, construction began on Tawa Dam, which was completed in 1978 in Tawa Nagar to create Tawa Reservoir in southern Hoshangabad District. Forty-four villages were submerged by the reservoir.

Surroundings
India's oldest forest preserve, the Bori Reserve Forest, was established in 1865 along the Tawa. The Bori Reserve Forest is part of the Bori Sanctuary, which is part of the Pachmarhi Biosphere Reserve, established in 1999, which covers much of the upper watershed of the Tawa.

References

Rivers of Madhya Pradesh
Tributaries of the Narmada River
Rivers of India